Nicolas Deschamps may refer to:

Nicolas Deschamps (ice hockey) (born 1990), Canadian ice hockey player
Nicolas Deschamps (writer) (1797–1872), French Jesuit writer